Lineage (Korean: 리니지) is a medieval fantasy massively multiplayer online role-playing game franchise by the South Korean video game developer NCSoft. It has become highly popular in South Korea with subscriptions counting into the millions, but is also available in Chinese, Japanese, Russian, and English-language versions. It is also one of the highest-grossing video game franchises of all time, having grossed $9.7 billion in lifetime revenue, as of 2019.

Games

 Lineage, released in 1998.
 Lineage M, a mobile port version of Lineage developed by NCSoft, released in South Korea on June 21, 2017.
 Lineage W, a sequel to Lineage, released in Asian markets in November 2021. The story is set in 150 years after story of Lineage.
 Lineage II, a prequel to Lineage, released in 2003. The story is set in 150 years before story of Lineage.
 Lineage 2: Revolution, a direct prequel to Lineage II. The story is set 100 years before the storyline of Lineage II: Goddess of Destruction. Developed by Netmarble Neo, the game was released on mobile platforms in 2017.
 Lineage 2 M, a mobile port version of Lineage II, released in November 2019.
 Lineage 2: Blood League, a mobile game developed by Snail Games, release date unannounced.
 Lineage Red Knights, a mobile game developed by NCSoft, released in 2017.
 Throne and Liberty, a direct sequel to Lineage, will release in 2023.

Revenue

The following is the gross revenue generated by the Lineage PC games. For the gross revenue generated by the Lineage mobile games, see the List of highest-grossing mobile games.

Notes

References

See also
 List of best-selling video game franchises

 
Video game franchises
Video game franchises introduced in 1998